Fortescue is a community and census-designated place (CDP) in Downe Township, Cumberland County, in the U.S. state of New Jersey. The community is located on the state's southern coast, on Delaware Bay, surrounded on three sides by marshland. It has a population of about 400. The area was named for John Fortescue, a local property owner at the time of American independence.

During the late 1970s and mid 1980s, Fortescue experienced the best fishing it had ever seen. Anglers were catching enormous numbers of weakfish every summer. Fortescue was the self-proclaimed "weakfish capital of the world". Overfishing led federal authorities to establish limits in the mid-1970s on the weakfish catch, though by 1990 the fish population had crashed, severely impacting the commercial fishing economy in the area.

Demographics

Climate
The climate in this area is characterized by hot, humid summers and generally mild to cool winters.  According to the Köppen Climate Classification system, Fortescue has a humid subtropical climate, abbreviated "Cfa" on climate maps.

References

Downe Township, New Jersey
Census-designated places in Cumberland County, New Jersey
Census-designated places in New Jersey
Unincorporated communities in Cumberland County, New Jersey
Unincorporated communities in New Jersey